A chalcogel or properly metal chalcogenide aerogel is an aerogel made from chalcogenides. Chalcogels preferentially absorb heavy metals, such as mercury, lead, and cadmium, from water. Sulfide chalcogels are also very good at desulfurization.

Metal chalcogenide aerogels can be prepared from thiolysis or nanoparticle condensation and contain crystalline nanoparticles in the structure. The synthetic method can be extended to many thioanions, including tetrathiomolybdate-based chalcogels. Different metal ions have been used as linkers Co2+, Ni2+, Pb2+, Cd2+, Bi3+, Cr3+.

When the gels are dried aerogels with high surface areas are obtained and the materials have multifunctional nature.  For example, chalcogels are especially promising for gas separation. They were reported to exhibit high selectivity in CO2 and C2H6 over H2 and CH4 adsorption. The latter is relevant to exit gas stream composition of water gas shift reaction and steam reforming reactions (reactions widely used for H2 production). For example, separation of gas pairs such as CO2/H2, CO2/CH4, and CO2/N2 are key steps in precombustion capture of CO2, natural gas sweetening and postcombustion capture of CO2 processes leading ultimately at upgrading of the raw gas. The above mentioned conditioning makes the gas suitable for a number of applications in fuel cells.

Chalcogels were shown to be very effective at capturing radionuclides from nuclear waste such as 99Tc, and 238U, and especially 129I.

References

External links
 Detailed background about the synthesis and applications of metal chalcogenide aerogels on Aerogel.org

Aerogels
Chalcogenides